Hamid Farrokhnezhad (born April 17, 1969) is an Iranian actor, writer and director. He has received various accolades, including four Crystal Simorgh (two for acting), two Hafez Awards, three Iran Cinema Celebration Awards and an Iran's Film Critics and Writers Association Award.

Career
He started his career in student theatre and making some short films. After acting in Khosrow Sinai's Dar Kooche-haye Eshgh he had the chance to play a role in another movie by Sinai, Aroos-e Atash aka Bride of fire which brought him many awards in Fajr Film Festival, Karlovy Vary International Film Festival and Khane-ye Cinema award. He had roles in three films by Sinai and had worked with notable Iranian directors such as Ebrahim Hatamikia, Asghar Farhadi and  Bahram Beyzayi.

He also gained TV popularity after acting in the role of a ghost named "Hasan Golab" in a TV series directed by Ebrahim Hatamikia.

On 26 March 2022, following the Russian invasion of Ukraine, Farrokhnezhad criticized the invasion of Ukraine, calling it “savagery” and “brutal attack”, and announced that he returned the best actor award he had received from the 2005 Moscow International Film Festival, in protest of the invasion.

Filmography

Film
{| class="wikitable"
|-
! Year
! Film
! English Title
! Role
! Director
|-
| 1991
| Dar Kooche-haye Eshgh
| "In the alleys of love"
|
| Khosrow Sinai
|-
| 2000
| Aroos-e Atash
| "Bride of fire"
| Farhan
| Khosrow Sinai
|-
| 2002
| Low Heights
| "Ertefa-e Past"
|Ghasem
|Ebrahim Hatamikia
|-
| 2004
| Tab
| "The Fever"
|
| Reza karimi
|-
| 2004
| Be Rang-e-Arghavan
| "In Amethyst Color"
| Behzad
| Ebrahim Hatamikia
|-
| 2005
| Big Drum Under Left Foot
| "Tabl-e Bozorg Zir-e Pay-e Chap"
| "Hafez 
| Kazem Ma'soumi
|-
| 2006
| Sahne-ye Jorm, Voroud Mamnou'''
| "Crime scene, No admittance"
| Maj. Parsa
| Ebrahim Sheibani
|-
| 2006
| Fireworks Wednesday| "Chaharshanbeh Soori"
| Morteza
| Asghar Farhadi
|-
| 2008
| Haghighat-e Gomshodeh| "The lost truth"
| Dr. Kia
| Mohammad Ahmadi
|-
| 2008
| Atashkar| "Fire keeper"
| Sohrab
| Mohsen Amiryoussefi
|-
| 2008
| Hareem| "Sanctum"
| Maj. Mohebbi
| Reza Khatibi
|-
| 2008
| Shab-e Vaghe'e| "The night of the incident"
| Daryagholi
| Shahram Asadi
|-
| 2009
| Poosteh| "The shell"
| Saeed
| Mostafa Al-e Ahmad
|-
| 2009
| Bidari-e Royaha| "The Awakening of the Dreams"
| Ayub's Brother
| Mohammad Ali Bashe Ahangar
|-
| 2009
| Democracy Tou Rouze Roshan | "Democracy in Daylight"
| Sotudeh
| Ali Atshani
|-
| 2010
| Shokolat-e Dagh| "Hot Chokolate"
| 
| Hamed Kolahdari
|-
| 2010
| Dar Entezare Mojezeh| "Waiting for a Miracle"
| Amir
| Rasul Sadr Ameli
|-
| 2010
| Mohammad| "Muhammad"
| Abu sufyan
| Majid Majidi
|-
| 2011
| Gasht-e Ershad| "Guidance Patrol"
| Haj Abbas
| Saeed Soheili
|-
| 2012
| Zendegi-e Khosusi-e Agha va Khanom-e Mim| "The Private Life of Mr. & Mrs. M "
| Mohsen Mehrad
| Rouhollah Hejazi
|-
| 2012
| Parinaaz| "Parinaz"
| Zakaria
| Bahram Bahramian
|-
| 2012
| Esterdad| "Reclamation"
| Faramarz Takin
| Ali Ghaffari
|-
| 2012
| The Wedlock| "Zendegi-ye Moshtarek-e Aghaye Mahmoudi va Banoo"
| Mansour Mahmoodi
| Ruhollah Hejazi
|-
| 2012
| Besharat be yek shahrvand-e Hezareye Sevvom| "Annunciation to a Third Millennium Citizen"
| Detective
| Mohammad Hadi Karimi
|-
| 2013
| Mordan be Vaght-e Shahrivar| "Death ath the Time of Shahrivar"
| Alireza
| Hatef Alimardani
|-
| 2013
| Parvaz-e Zanburha| "Flight of the Bees"
| 
| Hamed Amrayi
|-
| 2015
| Yasin| "Yasin"
| Mahmoud
| Hamed Amrayi
|-
| 2015
| Moshkel-e Giti| "Guiti's Problem"
| Iraj
| Bahram Kazemi
|-
| 2016
| Khoob, Bad, Jelf| "the Good,the Bad, the Gaudy"
| Major Shademan
| Peiman Ghasemkhani
|-
| 2016
| Gasht 2| "The Patrol 2"
| Haj Abbas
| Saeed Soheili
|-
| 2017
| Bi hesab | Getting Even
| Mohsen
| Mostafa Ahmadi
|-
| 2018
| Lottery| Lottery
| Morteza
| Mohammad Hossein Mahdavian
|-
| 2018
| Tegzas| Texas
| Uncle Hushang
| Masoud Atyabi
|-
| 2018
| Ma shoma ra doost darim khanom-e Yaya| We like you Mrs Yaya
| Morteza
| Abdolreza Kahani
|-
| 2019
| Symphony No. 9| Symphony No. 9
| 
| Mohammad Reza Honarmand
|-
| 2019
| The Devil's Daughter|
| nader
| Ghorban Mohammadpour
|}

Writing, directing and producing
 Kooche-ye Payeez -1998 - Production Manager - Dir. Khosrow Sinai
 Aroos-e Atash - 2000 -  Screenwriter - Dir. Khosrow Sinai
 Safar-e Sorkh - 2001 - Screenwriter and Director

Theater career
2004 - Shab-e Hezaroyekom (1001st night) - Dir. Bahram Beyzayi

TV career
2008 - Halghe-ye Sabz - Dir. Ebrahim Hatamikia

Awards and nominations
Crystal Simorgh of Best supporting actor for Aroos-e Atash in 18th Fajr International Film Festival
Crystal Simorgh of Best screenplay for Aroos-e Atash in 18th Fajr International Film Festival
35th Karlovy Vary International Film Festival award for best actor for Aroos-e AtashThe award for  Iranian actor of the year by Film Magazine critics in 2002 and 2003
Best Actor award for Tabl-e Bozorg Zir-e Pay-e Chap'' at the 27th Moscow International Film Festival in 2005
 Crystal Simorgh for Best leading actor for Esterdad in 31st Fajr International dFilm Festival

References

External links

Hamid Farrokhnezhad on Instagram

1969 births
Living people
Iranian screenwriters
Iranian film directors
People from Abadan, Iran
Iranian male film actors
University of Tehran alumni
Iranian male television actors
Crystal Simorgh for Best Actor winners
Crystal Simorgh for Best Screenplay winners
Crystal Simorgh for Best Supporting Actor winners